Nazma Akter (born 1975) is a Bangladeshi trade unionist and founder of the Awaj Foundation.

Biography
Nazma Akter is one of Bangladesh's foremost labour leaders. She began working in a clothing factory at the age of 11, alongside her mother, often doing as many as 70 hours a week. Akter joined a trade union because the women working in the factory were abused and poorly treated.

Nazma believes garment factories have the potential to empower women by giving them greater choice and opportunity, but is against exploitative and dangerous working practices and not treating women fairly. Today she is founder and president of Sommilito Garment Sramik Federation, an affiliated union with over 70,000 garment workers as members, and an alternate for IndustriALL, a global union.

Alongside her extensive and highly regarded union work, Akter founded the AWAJ Foundation in 2003, an organisation which promotes workers' welfare. As a result, she has been profiled and recognised as a leading campaigner against poverty by multiple sources including the World Poverty Institute, Channel 4 news, and The Guardian. She attended the 4th Annual Summit of Global Female Leaders.

Nazma lives in Dhaka with her husband and two children.

References

External links
 AWAJ Foundation

1975 births
Bangladeshi trade unionists
Living people
Bangladeshi women trade unionists